Roberto Della Casa (born 14 October 1942) is an Italian actor. He appeared in more than sixty films since 1970.

Selected filmography

References

External links 

1942 births
Living people
Italian male film actors
Male actors from Rome